Freidun Aghalyan (November 20, 1876 in Shusha, Russian Empire – February 1, 1944 in Yerevan) was an Armenian architect.

In 1903 Aghalian finished a building for the Saint-Petersburg Institute of Civil Engineering. Between 1903 & 1921 he oversaw the construction of railroad bridges, gymnasia, the Treasury palace and Workers' House in Baku, and the Armenian church of Armavir, Russia. In 1921 he moved to Yerevan, here he headed the construction department of Kanaker. He was the author of Kanaker HES and several other buildings in Yerevan, Kanaker and Getamej. After 1917, Aghalian also worked as a lecturer in Baku and then in Yerevan.

Sources
Concise Armenian Encyclopedia, Ed. by. acad. K. Khudaverdyan, Book 1, Yerevan, 1990, p. 121

1876 births
1944 deaths
Architects from Shusha
People from Elizavetpol Governorate
Soviet Armenians
Soviet architects
Saint-Petersburg State University of Architecture and Civil Engineering alumni